Live – The 50th Anniversary Tour is a live album by the Beach Boys released on May 21, 2013. The album was recorded during the band's 50th anniversary reunion tour.

Track listing
All tracks composed by Brian Wilson and Mike Love; except where indicated
Disc 1
"Do It Again" – 3:38
"Little Honda" – 2:06
"Catch a Wave" – 2:09
"Hawaii" – 1:46
"Don't Back Down" – 1:45
"Surfin' Safari" – 2:48
"Surfer Girl" (Brian Wilson) – 2:29
"The Little Girl I Once Knew"  (Brian Wilson) – 3:09
"Wendy" – 2:25 (Lead vocals by Bruce Johnston)
"Getcha Back" (Mike Love, Terry Melcher) – 2:42 (Lead vocals by David Marks)
"Then I Kissed Her" (Phil Spector, Ellie Greenwich, Jeff Barry) – 2:17
"Marcella" (Brian Wilson, Tandyn Almer, Jack Rieley) – 3:23
"Isn't It Time" (Brian Wilson, Mike Love, Joe Thomas, Jim Peterik, Larry Millas) – 4:01
"Why Do Fools Fall in Love" (Morris Levy, Frankie Lymon) – 2:30
"When I Grow Up (To Be a Man)" – 2:55
"Disney Girls" (Bruce Johnston) – 5:33 - taken from the band’s performance in Grand Prairie, TX on April 26
"Be True to Your School" – 3:06
"Little Deuce Coupe" (Brian Wilson, Roger Christian) – 1:50
"409" (Brian Wilson, Mike Love, Gary Usher) – 1:52
"Shut Down" (Brian Wilson, Roger Christian, Mike Love) – 1:46
"I Get Around" – 2:46

Disc 2
"Pet Sounds" (Brian Wilson) – 3:45
"Add Some Music to Your Day" (Brian Wilson, Joe Knott, Mike Love) – 3:49
"Heroes and Villains" (Brian Wilson, Van Dyke Parks) – 3:54
"Sail On, Sailor" (Brian Wilson, Van Dyke Parks, Almer, Ray Kennedy, Rieley) – 3:45
"California Saga: California" (Al Jardine) – 3:09
"In My Room" (Brian Wilson, Gary Usher) – 2:53
"All This Is That" (Al Jardine, Carl Wilson, Mike Love) – 3:38
"That's Why God Made the Radio" (Thomas, Brian Wilson, Peterik, Millas) – 4:27
"Forever" (Dennis Wilson, Gregg Jakobson) (Lead vocals by Dennis Wilson via archive recording) – 2:57
"God Only Knows" (Brian Wilson, Tony Asher) (Lead vocals by Carl Wilson via archive recording) – 2:39
"Sloop John B" (Traditional; arranged by Brian Wilson and Al Jardine) – 3:07
"Wouldn't It Be Nice" (Brian Wilson, Asher, Mike Love) (Lead vocals by Al Jardine, Jeff Foskett and Mike Love) – 2:41
"Good Vibrations" (Lead vocals by Brian Wilson, Jeff Foskett and Mike Love) – 4:14
"California Girls" – 3:15
"Help Me Rhonda" – 3:19
"Rock and Roll Music" (Chuck Berry) – 2:48
"Surfin' U.S.A." (Brian Wilson, Chuck Berry) – 3:00
"Kokomo" (Mike Love, Scott McKenzie, Tony Melcher, John Phillips) – 4:00
"Barbara Ann" (Fred Fassert) – 2:33
"Fun, Fun, Fun" – 3:29

Personnel
Partial credits from Craig Slowinski.
 
The Beach Boys
Al Jardine – lead, harmony and backing vocals; rhythm guitar; banjo on “California Saga: California”; additional lead guitar on "Sail On, Sailor"
Bruce Johnston – lead, harmony and backing vocals; keyboards
Mike Love – lead, harmony and backing vocals; percussion
David Marks – lead, harmony and backing vocals; lead guitar
Brian Wilson – lead, harmony and backing vocals; piano; bass on "Barbara Ann" and "Fun, Fun, Fun"
Carl Wilson – lead vocals on "God Only Knows" (archive recording)
Dennis Wilson  – lead vocals on "Forever" (archive recording)

Supporting musicians
Scott Bennett – keyboards, mallets, percussion, vocals
Nelson Bragg – percussion, vocals
John Cowsill – drums, vocals
Mike D'Amico – bass, vocals, drums on "Marcella", "Pet Sounds", and “Add Some Music To Your Day”
Nick "Nicky Wonder" Walusko  - guitar, vocals
Jeff Foskett – rhythm guitar, percussion, lead- and backingvocals, mandolin on "Disney Girls"
Probyn Gregory – guitar, horns, percussion, vocals, bass on "Marcella" and “Add Some Music To Your Day”, tannerin on "Good Vibrations" and "Forever", trumpet on "Pet Sounds"
Darian Sahanaja – keyboards, mallets, vocals
Scott Totten – guitar, vocals, ukulele on "Isn't It Time", bass on "Pet Sounds"
Paul von Mertens – woodwinds (saxophones, flutes, harmonicas)

References

External links
 Live - The 50th Anniversary Tour at Discogs
 Review - "Live - 50th Anniversary Tour" CD Set on Beach Boys Opinion Page

2013 live albums
2013 compilation albums
The Beach Boys live albums
The Beach Boys compilation albums
Capitol Records live albums
Albums produced by Brian Wilson
Albums produced by Joe Thomas (producer)